Eucalyptus pauciflora subsp. parvifructa is a mallee or small tree that is endemic to a small area of Victoria, Australia. It has smooth bark, slightly glaucous branchlets, glossy green, lance-shaped adult leaves, flower buds usually in groups of seven, white flowers and hemispherical or cup-shaped fruit. It differs from other subspecies of E. pauciflora in having a smaller habit and smaller leaves, flower buds and fruit.

Description
It has smooth, whitish bark. Subspecies parvifructa differs from others in the species in having a smaller habit and smaller leaves, flower buds and fruit.

Taxonomy and naming
Eucalyptus pauciflora subsp. parvifructa was first formally described in 1994 by Kevin James Rule in the journal Muelleria, from material collected near the summit of Mount William in 1970. The epithet (parvifructa) is from Latin, referring to the small size of the fruit.

Distribution

References

pauciflora
Flora of Victoria (Australia)
Plants described in 1994